Home Town Hero was an American rock band from Southern California active in the early 2000s. Founding members Aaron Bruno and Drew Stewart began playing together while attending Westlake High School, where their early project was known as the Ice Monkeys. They were greatly influenced by the success of Southern California punk bands of the early 1990s and the grunge aesthetic popularized by bands like Nirvana and Pearl Jam. With the later addition of bassist Todd Burns and drummer Ray Blanco the band re-christened themselves as Insurgence. As Insurgence they began playing famous California venues, including The Roxy Theatre and Whisky a Go Go.

When the band began work on their demo EP they again changed their name, this time to Home Town Hero. In 2000 and 2001, Home Town Hero joined the Vans Warped Tour, where they attracted the attention of Madonna's Maverick Records label. The band's eponymous major label debut was heavily promoted by Warner Bros. Records, and their single "Questions" received significant airplay in major American radio markets. "Questions" was also included in the video game soundtrack for Legends of Wrestling II in 2002.

Home Town Hero split up shortly before releasing their second LP, Bitch City, in 2004. The album did not get a physical release, but was freely available to download on the internet. The track "Robbers" was selected by EA Sports for the soundtrack to their MVP Baseball 2004 video game.

Vocalist Aaron Bruno and guitarist Drew Stewart went on to found Under the Influence of Giants under the Island Records label in 2005, then to Awolnation.

Ray Blanco is now drummer and songwriter of The Bangkok Five (Universal Records, execution style 2006, Sony, Long Live Crime 2008, Indiemedia, Inc 2010). A&R, writer, producer and partner of Fundamental Music. Business Development and Entertainment Alliances at Indiemedia, Inc. Owner and executive producer at Generator Productions. Owner and partner of The Lowtide Lounge beach bar in Esterillos Oeste, Costa Rica.

Discography

Albums
Home Town Hero (2002)
Bitch City (2004)

References

American post-grunge musical groups
Musical groups from California
Musical groups disestablished in 2004
Warner Records artists